Frane Bućan (born 25 August 1965 in Split) is a Croatian retired football player who played for HNK Šibenik, Hajduk Split, KRC Genk, MVV, Bonner SC and VfL Reinbach.

Club career
Bućan played in Belgium for Genk from 1989 until 1994, except for one season at Dutch side MVV. At Genk he formed an attacking partnership with Maltese forward Carmel Busuttil.

References

External links

hrsport.net
hajduk.hr

1965 births
Living people
Footballers from Split, Croatia
Association football midfielders
Yugoslav footballers
Croatian footballers
HNK Šibenik players
HNK Hajduk Split players
K.R.C. Genk players
MVV Maastricht players
Bonner SC players
Yugoslav First League players
Belgian Pro League players
Eredivisie players
Yugoslav expatriate footballers
Expatriate footballers in Belgium
Yugoslav expatriate sportspeople in Belgium
Expatriate footballers in the Netherlands
Yugoslav expatriate sportspeople in the Netherlands
Croatian expatriate footballers
Croatian expatriate sportspeople in Belgium
Expatriate footballers in Germany
Croatian expatriate sportspeople in Germany